Miguel A. García-Garibay is a professor of chemistry and biochemistry and the dean of physical sciences at University of California, Los Angeles (UCLA). His research focuses on solid state organic chemistry, photochemistry and spectroscopy, artificial molecular machines, and mesoscale phenomena.

Education 
García-Garibay received his B.S. from the University of Michoacán, Mexico, in 1982. After completing a combined degree in Chemistry, Biology, and Pharmacy, García-Garibay went on to get a PhD degree in Chemistry at the University of British Columbia, where he joined the group of John Scheffer.  After that, he joined the group of Nicholas Turro as a postdoctoral fellow at Columbia University.

García-Garibay received an Arthur C. Cope Scholar Award in 2015.

Awards and positions 
 ACS Fellow, 2019
 ACS Cope Scholar Award, 2015
 Appointment to the Chemical Sciences Roundtable of the NAS Board on Chemical Sciences and Technology, 2012–2018
 Associate Editor of the Journal of the ACS, 2009–2016
 NSF Creativity Award, 2009–2011
 American Competitiveness and Innovation Fellow, 2008
 Fellow of the AAAS, 2007
 Herbert Newby McCoy Award, UCLA, 1999 
 Dean's Marshal Award for the Division of Physical Sciences, UCLA, 1997 
 NSF Career Award 1996–99

References 

 

Mexican chemists
People from Morelia
University of California, Los Angeles faculty
21st-century American chemists
Year of birth missing (living people)
Living people
Universidad Michoacana de San Nicolás de Hidalgo alumni
University of British Columbia alumni
Solid state chemists
Photochemists